NAKED (official capitalization/stylization) are Agnes Gryczkowska and Alexander Johnston, a London-based duo (originally from Edinburgh) whose work engages with noise, industrial, experimental and extreme forms of electronic music. Their music and live shows are dark and raw explosions of hard industrial rhythms, screamed vocals and violent performance art. Originally a trio of Agnes Gryczkowska, Alexander Johnston and Grant Campbell, but Grant Campbell left the band in the end of 2015, so since that it's a duo.

Their last record, Total Power Exchange, used the sounds of noise, sex, vomit and distorted vocals and featured in Aphex’s Twins sets and Cosey Fanni Tutti's mixes. They debuted a new performance called The Cage which placed the audience inside an industrial-sized cage in an underground vault in Somerset House, London. They toured extensively performing in clubs, festivals and galleries across Europe and Asia including Unsound, CTM Festival, Serpentine Galleries, Cafe OTO, SXSW, RBMA and more.

Discography

References

Musical groups from Edinburgh
Musical groups from London
Musical groups established in 2013
2013 establishments in England